Cantley railway station is on the Wherry Lines in the East of England, serving the village of Cantley, Norfolk. Its three-letter station code is CNY.

History
The Bill for the Yarmouth & Norwich Railway (Y&NR), the first public railway line in Norfolk, received Royal Assent on 18 June 1842. Work started on the line in April 1843 and it opened on 1 May 1844. In June 1845 the Y&NR was amalgamated with the Norwich & Brandon Railway and Cantley station became a Norfolk Railway asset.

In 1847 the station was closed due to lack of traffic. The Eastern Counties Railway (ECR) took over the Norfolk Railway in May 1848 and the station reopened in 1851. In August 1862 all railways in East Anglia were consolidated to form the Great Eastern Railway (GER). The Railways Act 1921 led to the creation of the Big Four companies and the GER amalgamated with several companies to form the London and North Eastern Railway (LNER). Cantley became an LNER station on 1 January 1923. Upon nationalisation in 1947 the station became part of the Eastern Region of British Railways

In 1997 the privatisation of British Rail saw the station and its services were transferred to Anglia Railways, which operated it until 2004 when National Express East Anglia won the replacement franchise. In 2012 Abellio Greater Anglia won the franchise.

Services
As of the December 2022 timetable the typical weekday service at Cantley is four trains to call at the station hourly during peak and evening services and two-hourly during the day time off-peak. Most trains serve the Lowestoft to Norwich line. The service frequency of trains using the  branch to run from Great Yarmouth to Norwich is usually two per day in both directions but this can very depending on the time of the year. Saturday services run with a similar frequency.

Sundays during the spring sees eight trains a day in both directions between Norwich and Great Yarmouth via Reedham, every two hours throughout the day until the late evening.

References

External links 

Railway stations in Norfolk
DfT Category F2 stations
Former Great Eastern Railway stations
Greater Anglia franchise railway stations
Railway stations in Great Britain opened in 1844
Railway stations in Great Britain closed in 1847
Railway stations in Great Britain opened in 1851
Cantley, Norfolk